Apararenone (INN) (developmental code name MT-3995) is a nonsteroidal antimineralocorticoid which is under development by Mitsubishi Tanabe Pharma for the treatment of diabetic nephropathies and non-alcoholic steatohepatitis. It was also previously being developed for the treatment of hypertension, but development was discontinued for this indication. Apararenone acts as a highly selective antagonist of the mineralocorticoid receptor (Ki < 50 nM), the receptor for aldosterone. As of 2017, it is in phase II clinical trials.

See also
 Esaxerenone
 Finerenone

References

External links
 Apararenone - AdisInsight

Antimineralocorticoids
Benzoxazines
Experimental drugs
Fluoroarenes
Sulfonamides